Tajuan Edward "Ty" Law (born February 10, 1974) is an American former football cornerback who played in the National Football League (NFL) for 15 seasons, primarily with the New England Patriots. He played college football for the Michigan Wolverines and was selected by the Patriots in the first round of the 1995 NFL Draft. During his 10 seasons in New England, he received four Pro Bowl selections and two first-team All-Pro honors. A three-time Super Bowl winner with the Patriots, Law also holds the franchise record for interceptions. Law spent his final five seasons as a member of the New York Jets, Kansas City Chiefs, and Denver Broncos, earning a fifth Pro Bowl selection with the Jets. Ranking 24th in NFL career interceptions, he twice led the league in interceptions during the 1998 and 2005 seasons. He was inducted to the Pro Football Hall of Fame in 2019.

Early years
Law attended Aliquippa High School in Aliquippa, in Beaver County, Pennsylvania, where he played football and basketball, and ran track. He played in football as a cornerback, safety, wide receiver, and running back. He was named MVP of the school's basketball team.

Tony Dorsett, a Hall of Fame running back, is Law's uncle. Law spent summers in Dallas with Dorsett while he was growing up.

College career
Law had a three-year stint at the University of Michigan, where he lettered three years in a row (1992–94), earned first-team All-American honors from the Walter Camp Football Foundation as a junior, and was a two-time unanimous All-Big Ten Conference selection. He was on the cover of the October 3, 1994, issue of Sports Illustrated, though it was an ignominious honor; he is the defender over whom Colorado Buffaloes receiver Michael Westbrook is leaping on the famous Miracle at Michigan play. Following his junior year, he left Michigan to enter the 1995 NFL Draft due to financial hardship after his grandfather declared bankruptcy.

He finished his college career with 154 tackles [120 solo, 34 assist], six interceptions, and 17 passes defended.

Professional career

New England Patriots
The New England Patriots selected Law in the first round (23rd overall) of the 1995 NFL Draft. Law was the second cornerback drafted in 1995 after Fort Valley State's Tyrone Poole.  Poole later joined Law on the Patriots in 2003.

1995
On July 20, 1995, the New England Patriots signed Law to a five-year, $5.50 million contract. Throughout training camp, Law competed to be a starting cornerback against Maurice Hurst. Head coach Bill Parcells named Law the third cornerback on the Patriots’ depth chart, behind Ricky Reynolds and Hurst.

He made his professional regular-season debut in the New England Patriots’ season-opener against the Cleveland Browns, ironically against Bill Belichick. On October 1, 1995, Law earned his first career start and made four combined tackles during a 30–17 loss at the Atlanta Falcons in week 4. He missed two games (weeks 8–9) due to an injury. Law became a starting cornerback in week 12 after the Patriots released Maurice Hurst. On November 26, 1995, Law made six combined tackles, deflected a pass, and made his first career interception against the Buffalo Bills off  of Jim Kelly. In week 15, he collected a season-high eight combined tackles, broke up a pass deflection, and intercepted a pass attempt by Jets’ quarterback Boomer Esiason during a 31–28 win against the New York Jets. He made an interception in three consecutive games since taking over the starting role. In week 17, he collected a season-high eight solo tackles and made his first career sack during a 10–7 loss at the Indianapolis Colts. Law sacked Colts’ quarterback Jim Harbaugh for a six-yard loss during the first quarter. He finished his rookie season in 1995 with 47 combined tackles (40 solo), nine pass deflections, three interceptions, and one sack in 14 games and seven starts.

1996
Former Cleveland Browns head coach Bill Belichick became the assistant head coach for the New England Patriots in 1996. Law and Rickey Reynolds retained their roles as starting cornerbacks. On October 20, 1996, Law collected a season-high 12 combined tackles (10 solo) and deflected two passes during a 27–9 victory at the Indianapolis Colts in week 8. Law was inactive for three games (weeks 11–13) due to an injury. On December 8, 1996, Law recorded one tackle, deflected a pass, and returned an interception for his first career touchdown as the Patriots defeated the New York Jets 34–10 in week 15. Law intercepted a pass by Jets’ quarterback Glenn Foley that was intended for wide receiver Keyshawn Johnson, and returned it for a 38-yard touchdown during the third quarter. In week 16, Law made seven solo tackles, a season-high three pass deflections, and intercepted two pass attempts by Troy Aikman during a 12–6 loss at the Dallas Cowboys. He finished the 1996 NFL season with 62 combined tackles (56 solo), nine pass deflections, three interceptions, and one touchdown in 13 games and 12 starts.

The New England Patriots finished first in the AFC East with an 11–5 record and earned a first-round bye. On January 5, 1997, Law started in his first career playoff game and made three combined tackles during a 28–3 victory against the Pittsburgh Steelers in the AFC Divisional Round. The following week, he recorded four tackles as the Patriots defeated the Jacksonville Jaguars 20–6 during the AFC Championship game. On January 26, 1997, Law started in Super Bowl XXXI and made three combined tackles during a 35–21 loss against the Green Bay Packers.

1997
On January 31, 1997, New England Patriots’ head coach Bill Parcells resigned five days after their loss in Super Bowl XXXI. On February 3, 1997, the New England Patriots announced their decision to hire San Francisco 49ers’ defensive coordinator Pete Carroll as their new head coach.

Law returned as the number-one cornerback in 1997 and started alongside Jimmy Hitchcock. In week 15, he collected a season-high nine solo tackles during a 26–20 victory at the Jacksonville Jaguars. He started in all 16 games in 1997 and made 77 combined tackles (69 solo), 11 pass deflections, and three interceptions, and was credited with half a sack.

1998
Patriots’ head coach Pete Carroll named Law and Chris Canty the starting cornerbacks to begin the regular season. On September 13, 1998, Law recorded two solo tackles, three pass deflections, intercepted two passes, and returned one for a touchdown during a 29–6 win against the Indianapolis Colts in week 2. Law intercepted a pass by Colts’ quarterback Peyton Manning that was intended for tight end Marcus Pollard, and returned it for a 59-yard touchdown during the first quarter. In week 8, Law collected a season-high seven solo tackles, deflected two passes, and made one interception during a 12–9 overtime loss at the Miami Dolphins. On November 8, 1998, Law made four combined tackles and two pass deflections, and intercepted two passes by Chris Chandler as the Patriots lost 41–10 against the Atlanta Falcons in week 10. Law started in all 16 games in 1998 and recorded 70 combined tackles (60 solo), 32 pass deflections, nine interceptions, and one touchdown. Law became the first member of the New England Patriots to lead the league in interceptions and was also voted to the 1999 Pro Bowl to mark the first of his career.

1999
On August 21, 1999, the Patriots signed Law to a six-year, $50 million contract extension that includes a signing bonus of $14 million. On October 17, 1999, Law collected a season-high nine combined tackles and two pass deflections, and returned an interception by Dolphins’ quarterback Dan Marino for a 27-yard touchdown during the first quarter of the Patriots’ 31–30 loss against the Miami Dolphins in week 6. Law missed two games (weeks 15–16) due to a broken hand. On December 29, 1999, the New England Patriots placed Law on injured reserve due to his broken hand. He finished the season with 57 combined tackles (48 solo), nine pass deflections, two forced fumbles, two interceptions, and one touchdown.

2000
On January 3, 2000, New England  fired head coach Pete Carroll after they finished the season with an 8–8 record. On January 27, 2000, they announced former New York Jets’ defensive coordinator Bill Belichick as their new head coach. Belichick named Law and Antonio Langham as the starting cornerback tandem to begin 2000. In week 3, he collected a season-high nine combined tackles during a 21–13 loss against the Kansas City Chiefs. On December 18, 2000, Law was stopped by U.S. Customs officials in Niagara Falls, New York, while crossing the Rainbow Bridge. During the routine inspection, officials found three whole ecstasy pills and four that were partially crushed. Law and teammates Terry Glenn and Troy Brown were returning from visiting an adult nightclub in Canada. Federal prosecutors declined to prosecute Law due to the small amount. U.S. Customs seized the drug and fined Law $700. On December 20, 2000, New England Patriots’ head coach Bill Belichick announced his decision to suspend Law for the final game of the season. He finished the season with 74 combined tackles (58 solo), 11 pass deflections, and two interceptions in 15 games and 15 starts.

2001-2002
The New England Patriots hired Romeo Crennel as their new defensive coordinator. Law returned as the number-one starting cornerback and started alongside Otis Smith.

Law earned his first Super Bowl ring with the Patriots in 2001. In Super Bowl XXXVI, he intercepted a Kurt Warner pass and returned it 47 yards for a touchdown, the first points of the game for the Patriots, who eventually won the game 20–17.

2003
Law was voted to the Pro Bowl for the second consecutive year and for the fourth time in his career after the 2003 season. In 2003, he was part of a record-breaking Patriots defense that led the NFL in four key categories - opponents’ points per game (14.9), opponents’ passer rating (56.2), interceptions (29), and passing touchdowns surrendered (11). His physical play against some of the game's best receivers prompted the NFL to more strictly enforce the five-yard illegal contact rule on defensive backs after the 2003 season.  In the AFC Championship Game against the Colts, Law intercepted three passes from Colts quarterback Peyton Manning, assisting his team to a 24–14 win and their second Super Bowl appearance in three years, where they defeated the Carolina Panthers 32–29.

2004
Law earned his third Super Bowl ring with the Patriots in 2004, but missed the final nine games of the season and all three of the Patriots' playoff games due to a foot injury.

2005
On February 25, 2005, Law was released by the Patriots due to his $12.551 million cap salary. Since then, he has represented the Patriots in a few games as an honorary team captain. In 2014, he was inducted into the Patriots Hall of Fame.

New York Jets
On August 8, 2005, the New York Jets signed Law to a three-year contract as an unrestricted free agent. The contract has incentives that could pay Law $28 million over the first three years and also has options that total $50 million over seven years. He then went on to have one of his best years there, gaining a career-high 10 interceptions. He was also the only Jet voted into the Pro Bowl (Jonathan Vilma was named to the Pro Bowl as an injury replacement to Miami's Zach Thomas, not by means of popular vote by the fans). Law was released by the New York Jets on February 22, 2006 as the Jets were a projected $26 million over the salary cap for 2006. He was due to make $7.6 million in 2006.

Kansas City Chiefs

On July 25, 2006, Law passed his physical with the Chiefs and signed a five-year deal worth $30 million. He reunited with coach Herman Edwards, under whom Law had played in the 2005 season hoping to strengthen the Chiefs' defense.

Second stint with Jets
On November 10, 2008, Law agreed to terms on a one-year contract with the New York Jets. Following the end of season, the Jets once again released him on February 24, 2009.

Denver Broncos
Law signed with the Denver Broncos on November 7, 2009. This added to a defensive backfield that had five members over 30 years of age, with 20 Pro Bowl selections combined. His final game with the Broncos came on January 3, 2010. He finished the season with 10 tackles and one interception run back for 37 yards. He was released by the Broncos on February 24, 2010.

His time in Denver was short and uneventful, only lasting a season. It was his second choice, as he would have preferred to play in New England, but signed with Denver. Even though his last season was in Denver, Law stated, "I am a Patriot for life."

NFL career statistics

Regular season

Retirement
After retiring from the NFL, Law founded Launch Trampoline Park, a chain of entertainment facilities based around large areas of connected trampolines. Launch currently has franchised locations across New England, with one park open in Delaware. The website of its Rhode Island location reports that Law makes frequent appearances there, where he participates in games of trampoline dodgeball with customers.

On May 19, 2014, Law was announced as the 2014 Patriots Hall of Fame Inductee. He was inducted on August 1. On February 2, 2019, he was selected to the Pro Football Hall of Fame class of 2019; he was inducted on August 3, 2019, in Canton, Ohio.

References

External links
 New England Patriots bio

1974 births
African-American players of American football
American Conference Pro Bowl players
American football cornerbacks
American football safeties
Denver Broncos players
Kansas City Chiefs players
Living people
Michigan Wolverines football players
New England Patriots players
New York Jets players
People from Aliquippa, Pennsylvania
Players of American football from Pennsylvania
Pro Football Hall of Fame inductees
Sportspeople from the Pittsburgh metropolitan area
21st-century African-American sportspeople
20th-century African-American sportspeople